Sami Yusuf (born 21 July 1980) is a British singer, songwriter, multi-instrumentalist and composer. He gained international attention with the release of his debut album, Al-Muʽallim, in 2003. As of 2020, he has released eight studio albums, five live albums and one compilation album. His studio albums were mostly released by Andante Records, with the first two being released by Awakening Records. He has sold over 34 million albums as of 2016.

Besides English, Yusuf has performed in Arabic, Azerbaijani, Persian, Turkish, Punjabi, as well as, Urdu, sometimes in the same work, as was the case with his hit, Hasbi Rabbi. His work is marked by blending different musical styles and genres, including elements from Sufi, folk, and Rock music. He used his multilingual and multi-instrumentalist style to address social, spiritual, and humanitarian issues. In recognition of his philanthropy, in 2014, Yusuf was appointed United Nations Global Ambassador for the World Food Programme.

Early life 
Sami Yusuf was born in 21 July 1980 in Tehran to Azerbaijani parents. His grandparents are from Baku, Azerbaijan, from which they left to Iran when it was captured by the Bolsheviks following World War I. Yusuf and his parents later arrived in Ealing, West London, in the early 1980s, after the Islamic Revolution in Iran. From an early age, Yusuf showed great interest in music. He was influenced by the wide range of musical genres available to him in Ealing, immersing himself especially in Western classical music and Middle Eastern music. He learned the piano and violin as well as traditional instruments including the oud, setar, and tonbak. At the age of 16, Yusuf experienced a spiritual revival that made him become a "more committed Muslim". In 2003, although considering pursuing a career in law, he produced and released his first album. It quickly became an international success and launched Yusuf's professional music career. Yusuf studied music as a composition student at the prestigious Royal Academy, as well as at Salford University in north-west England.

Music career

2003–2009
In 2003, Yusuf released his debut album, Al-Muʽallim, an album that he produced, wrote, and performed. Its feature song, Al-Mu'allim, became a hit in the Middle East, North Africa, and South-East Asia, topping the charts in Egypt and Turkey for twelve consecutive weeks, selling millions of copies worldwide and reaching a diverse audience. The last track of the album, Supplication, was used in the Golden-Globe award-nominated film, The Kite Runner.

Yusuf garnered increased worldwide recognition following the release of his second album, My Ummah, in 2005. The album, using both Eastern and Western sounds, utilized wide-ranging musical instrumentation. Considered a breakthrough album, it sold over four million copies globally and was well received particularly by young people, who identified closely with the themes of Yusuf's lyrics.

Yusuf left Awakening Records following a controversy over Without You, an album that he claimed was released without his knowledge or consent.

2010–2016
Wherever You Are, Yusuf's third official album, was released in March 2010. Rolling Stone called the album "beautifully produced". With its release, Yusuf welcomed what he termed a "new chapter" in his professional career and music.

Yusuf's fourth album, Salaam, was released in December 2012. Within four months of its launch it achieved platinum status in Southeast Asia and was the best-selling album in the Middle East and North Africa. The album includes the song "Hear Your Call," composed by Yusuf to call attention to the situation of people who are affected by natural disasters.

The Centre was released in 2014 and is a collection of 13 songs in which Yusuf hopes his listeners will find inspiration to seek their individual spiritual centres. It is a new sound that has multicultural influences, employing traditional as well as contemporary Middle Eastern, North African, and European poetry, instrumentation, and melodies.

Yusuf's sixth album, Songs of the Way, was released in January 2015. All lyrics are by the noted philosopher Seyyed Hossein Nasr and are from his books of poetry, Poems of the Way and The Pilgrimage of Life. Except for two tracks in Persian and Arabic, the songs are in English.

Barakah, Yusuf's seventh album, was released in February 2016 by Andante Records. It is the result of extensive research into the traditional music and poetry contained in the album. Yusuf said it is his musical response to the increasing chaos and noise of today's world, and his wish is that these music and lyrics offer a window onto an inner oasis of peace and harmony. The song "Mast Qalandar" from Barakah reached #1 on World Music charts on iTunes and BBC Music.

According to Yusuf, the new album aims "to respond to the growing extremism in our world with a call for a return to harmony and balance."

Following its release, Yusuf performed in the Dubai Opera in 2016 and released it as a live album.

2017–present
In 2017, Yusuf performed in New Delhi, India. 4 songs from the performance were released in 2019.

In 2018, Yusuf released his new EP, SAMi, as a side project that grew out of his desire to explore his British musical roots. The song collection, with its accessible sounds and direct lyricism, finds Yusuf's exploring the western sounds emanating from his childhood growing up in London.

SAMi has sold well and topped a number of iTunes charts since its release, and Yusuf says he is grateful and somewhat surprised that he wasn't criticised for the commercial nature of the project.

Yusuf performed in Baku, Azerbaijan, in 2019 (A Timeless Presence) with nine new songs exploring Azerbaijani culture and all instruments except for the piano being Azerbaijani.

In November 2020, Yusuf gave an online concert from his studio at home. He performed his singles "Al Faqir" and "The 99 Names", released in May 2018 and May 2020 respectively.

In late 2021, Yusuf performed at Expo 2020.

Yusuf has said that he plans to release a new album by the name of Ecstasy. While originally planned for 2019, the project was delayed to 2022.

Notable tours and concert performances 
Playing in Farum Arena, Denmark, Grugahalle in Germany, and De Doelen in the Netherlands, Yusuf introduced his forthcoming album, Wherever You Are.
He performed in Azerbaijan for the first time in 2006, for the second time in 2015 (14–15 March), and 22 March 2017 in Heydar Aliyev Palace in Baku, 250,000 people attended his performance in Taksim Square in Istanbul to see Yusuf perform in 2013. Yusuf has played across four continents, packing venues such as Wembley Arena in London, Shrine Auditorium in Los Angeles and The Velodrome in Cape Town, South Africa. He sings in English, Arabic, Turkish, Persian, Azerbaijani, Malay and Urdu and is backed by a range of both classical and ethnic instruments. Yusuf also performed in Washington, D.C.

Yusuf performed in Dubai for the first time in December 2016. He premiered the song "Glorification", inspired by the poetry of His Highness Shaikh Mohammad Bin Rashid Al Maktoum, Vice-President and Prime Minister of the UAE and Ruler of Dubai.

Humanitarian work 
Since early in his professional career, Yusuf has participated in humanitarian initiatives by performing benefit concerts, releasing charity singles, and acting on behalf of organizations to relieve suffering and poverty. In response to the 2010 Pakistan floods that wreaked havoc in the country and affected 20 million lives in the summer of 2010, he promptly released a charity single entitled "Hear Your Call", performed in English and Urdu, to raise funds for the displaced Pakistanis in a joint-effort with the UN-sponsored charity organization Save the Children.

In 2014, he was appointed "UN Global Ambassador" for the World Food Programme.

Personal life 
Sami spoke of his background as "diverse" and cited this as evidence for his "tendency to bring people together".

His wife is of German origin and had converted to Islam before she met Yusuf.

Religious and political views 

Sami Yusuf has gained widespread popularity throughout the Muslim world for his spiritual music. But artists like him and Maher Zain have faced some opposition from conservative Muslims who deem music impermissible. In 2006, British journalist and convert to Islam Yvonne Ridley wrote an article criticising Yusuf for displaying patriotic sentiments at his concerts and supporting the Metropolitan Police's recruitment of British Muslims, writing that "If he is so proud to be British, why is he living in the great Middle Eastern democracy of Egypt?" In response, Sami wrote an open letter extensively discussing his stance on music and the modern art industry in general from both an Islamic jurisprudence perspective and a social one. The response was commended by several commentators.

In a previous interview, Yusuf described himself as generally apolitical. Later in 2017, he wrote an open letter criticizing the Trump Muslim ban. Quoting First they came, Yusuf emphasized solidarity between the Western and Muslim worlds and opposed Trumpism.

Honors and awards 
In 2009, Yusuf was awarded an honorary Doctor of Letters in recognition of his "extraordinary contributions to the field of music" by Roehampton University, London. Silatech appointed him as their first Global Ambassador in the same year, later joining Ahmad Al Shugairi in the same position.

Widely regarded as the highest profile Muslim musician in the UK, Yusuf has appeared each year since 2010 on the list of the "World's 500 Most Influential Muslims".

In 2014, the United Nations appointed him Global Ambassador Against Hunger, and in 2015 the UN appointed him as an "Elite Ambassador" for the UN World Interfaith Harmony Week.

In 2016, Yusuf received a Recognition Award for his contributions to promoting the message of peace and tolerance as part of the Mohammed bin Rashid Al Maktoum World Peace Initiative.

In 2019, Yusuf received an honorary diploma from the First Vice President of Azerbaijan for his contributions to promote Azerbaijani music and culture.

In the media 
"Islam's Biggest Rock Star" – Time magazine (2006)
"Biggest Star in the Middle East" – The Guardian (2006)
"King of Islamic Pop" – Al Jazeera (2007)
IOL Star of 2009 (2009)
BBC's 30 More Famous Britons (2009)

Discography

Studio albums

Live albums

Compilation albums

Singles

References

External links 

Sami Yusuf's Official Website
Sami Yusuf's Facebook
Sami Yusuf's Instagram

1980 births
Living people
English Muslims
British Muslims
People from Tehran
Singers from Tehran
British male singers
Urdu-language singers
British Sunni Muslims
Iranian Sunni Muslims
Azeri Sunni Muslims
Rotana Records artists
Awakening Music artists
Arabic-language singers
Persian-language singers
Turkish-language singers
21st-century male singers
British singer-songwriters
World Food Programme people
Performers of Islamic music
Iranian emigrants to England
21st-century British singers
Azerbaijani-language singers
Universal Music Group artists
British male singer-songwriters
British people of Iranian descent
21st-century British male singers
Ambassadors of supra-national bodies
English people of Azerbaijani descent
Iranian people of Azerbaijani descent
British people of Azerbaijani descent
Iranian emigrants to the United Kingdom
Converts to Sunni Islam from Shia Islam
People associated with the Royal Academy of Music